Ratu Popi Epeli Cakobau (1883–11 October 1936) was a Fijian chief and politician. He held the title of Vunivalu of Bau from 1914 until his death in 1936, and was also a nominated member of the Legislative Council.

Biography
Born Popi Epeli Senioli, he was the son of Josefa Celua, who was the third son of the Tui Viti Seru Epenisa Cakobau and Litia Samanunu, Ratu Popi inherited the title from his cousin, Penaia Kadavulevu in 1914.

Like his predecessor, Ratu Popi was a parliamentarian in the Legislative Council of Fiji. After his death in 1936, it is argued that his eldest son Tevita Naulivou inherited the title of Vunivalu, after whom it transferred to another son, George Cakobau.

Popi and his wife Adi Torika were Christian converts.

In 1934 he changed his name by deed poll to Popi Epeli Cakobau. In the same year he was made a Justice of the Peace.

References

S. Berwick, Who's Who in Fiji, Berwick Publishing House, 1990

1883 births
Fijian chiefs
Vunivalu of Bau
1936 deaths
Tui Kaba
20th-century Oceanian people
Members of the Legislative Council of Fiji
Fijian justices of the peace